Eli James Harrison (12 October 1903 – 9 September 1976) was an Australian politician. Born in Port Macquarie to farmer William Binney and Sophia Selina Turnbull, he was educated at state schools. He then worked on a dairy farm before joining New South Wales Government Railways in 1925. He was an official of the Australian Federated Union of Locomotive Enginemen from 1930 to 1949, and was its president in 1948. He was active in local Labor Party politics, and was elected to the New South Wales Legislative Council in 1943. He held that position until 1949, when he transferred to federal politics, defeating former Premier Jack Lang for the new seat of Blaxland. He held the seat until his retirement in 1969. He first married Una Grace May Brown at Pleasant Plains, near Port Macquarie, on 15 October 1924, three days after reaching adulthood. This marriage was dissolved on 6 July 1968. He subsequently married Joyce Ethel McGovern on 7 September 1975 at North Melbourne, but died the following year.

References

 

Australian Labor Party members of the Parliament of Australia
Members of the Australian House of Representatives for Blaxland
Members of the Australian House of Representatives
1903 births
1976 deaths
20th-century Australian politicians
Members of the New South Wales Legislative Council